Jamaica Air Shuttle was a domestic and western Caribbean regional airline based at the Tinson Pen Aerodrome in Kingston, Jamaica. The airline began service on 7 December 2009, offering "on-demand" scheduled and private charter services to Jamaica's international and domestic airports.

History
Jamaica Air Shuttle is a privately held Jamaican airline, operating nineteen scheduled round-trip services per week between Kingston's Tinson Pen Aerodrome and Sangster International Airport in Montego Bay. The airline's hub is Tinson Pen Aerodrome on Marcus Garvey Drive in Kingston. Jamaica Air Shuttle has suspended its flight operations as of 18 February 2013.

The company formed after the principals of Jamaica's Airways International Limited and Carib Aviation Limited, a now-defunct airline that previously operated from Antigua and Barbuda, merged operations to provide scheduled service to passengers needing to travel between Kingston and Montego Bay. Private charters within Jamaica, and between the island's international airports and regional cities in Haiti, the Dominican Republic, the Cayman Islands, and Cuba are also available.

After several months of operation, the company announced that it would be expanded its scheduled service Cayman Brac, Port-au-Prince in Haiti and Santiago de Cuba in Cuba.

The airline was grounded on 18 February 2013, as the owner of the planes the company uses pulled out of business. After failing to gain new investors, the company ceased operations.

Fleet

Destinations

Currently, Jamaica Air Shuttle served domestic airports and aerodromes across Jamaica. Its hub is Tinson Pen Aerodrome in Kingston (KTP), and its other major gateway was Sangster International Airport in Montego Bay (MBJ).

Charter service was available between Tinson Pen (KTP) and Sangster International Airport (MBJ)and the following domestic airports and aerodromes:

Tinson Pen Aerodrome (KTP) Hub
Ken Jones Aerodrome, Port Antonio (POT)
Ian Fleming International Airport, Boscobel (OCJ)

Regional service was also available to the following Caribbean destination:

Toussaint Louverture International Airport, Port-au-Prince, Haiti (PAP)
Antonio Maceo Airport, Santiago de Cuba, Cuba (SCU)

Frequent Flyer Program

Jamaica Air Shuttle offered its Frequent Flyer Program to passengers who foresaw continued use of the airline's domestic service. The loyalty program was introduced in December 2009, and provided passengers with the opportunity to pre-purchase blocks of tickets for domestic travel. This pre-purchase facilitates unrestricted travel for passengers, including the ability to make flight changes and cancel booked flights without incurring any fees. In addition, passengers are not subject to changes in air fare; pre-purchased tickets attract a set air fare.

Each block of ten tickets purchased for domestic travel came with an additional eleventh "free" ticket, which thereby allowed passengers to experience overall savings of 25% off the normal fare.

References

External links 

 Official website

Defunct airlines of Jamaica
Airlines established in 2009
Airlines disestablished in 2013
Companies based in Kingston, Jamaica